Columbia Commercial Historic District may refer to:

Columbia Commercial Historic District (Columbia, Kentucky), listed on the National Register of Historic Places in Adair County
Columbia Commercial Historic District (Columbia, South Carolina), NRHP-listed
Columbia Commercial Historic District (Columbia, Tennessee), NRHP-listed in Maury County

See also
Columbia Historic District (disambiguation)